Guess Who's Coming to Breakfast may refer to:

 "Guess Who's Coming to Breakfast?" (Frasier), an episode of the television series Frasier
 "Guess Who's Coming to Breakfast?", an episode of the television series Las Vegas
 "Guess Who's Coming To Breakfast?" (1968) the British release title of a German film originally called Die Nichten der Frau Oberst, directed by Erwin C. Dietrich

See also 
 "Guess Who Came to Breakfast", an episode of the television series Tyler Perry's House of Payne
 "Guess Who's Coming to Breakfast, Lunch and Dinner", an episode of the sitcom Married... with Children
 "Guess Who's Coming to Breakfast, Lunch and Dinner", an episode of the television series The New Lassie
 "Guess Who's Coming for Brefnish", an episode of the television series Taxi